Hervé Maurey (born 7 May 1961) is a member of the Senate of France, representing the Eure department.  He is a member of the New Centre (NC). He has been the mayor of Bernay, Eure between 2003 and 2016.

Political career
In the Senate, Maurey chairs the Committee on Regional Planning and Sustainable Development. In addition to his committee assignments, he is a member of the Senate’s French-Ukrainian Parliamentary Friendship Group.

Other activities
 SNCF, Member of the Supervisory Board

References

Page on the Senate website

1961 births
Living people
The Centrists politicians
French Senators of the Fifth Republic
Mayors of places in Normandy
Paris 2 Panthéon-Assas University alumni
Sciences Po alumni
Union of Democrats and Independents politicians
Senators of Eure